Rock Rift Mountain is a mountain located in the Catskill Mountains of New York south-southwest of Walton. Twadell Mountain is located southeast, and Houck Mountain is located northeast of Rock Rift Mountain.

References

Mountains of Delaware County, New York
Mountains of New York (state)